Ina Müller (born 25 July 1965) is a German singer-songwriter, comedian, television host, and author.

Early life
Müller was born into a farming family in Köhlen, Lower Saxony, West Germany. The fourth out of five sisters, she suffered from hospitalism until her teenage years. After her school graduation, Müller trained to be a pharmacy technician. The next years she worked for a number of pharmacies in Bremen, Munich and on Sylt.

Career
In 1994, Müller and her friend Edda Schnittgard founded the comedy duo Queen Bee.

From 2007, Müller has hosted the popular late-night music and variety television show Inas Nacht (Ina's Night), broadcast on NDR and originating from a pub in Hamburg.

Discography

Studio albums

References

External links

 Official website

1965 births
German television personalities
German television presenters
German women television presenters
German women singers
German singer-songwriters
Living people
Norddeutscher Rundfunk people